Rich Lackner (born July 28, 1956) is an American former college football coach. He is served as the head football coach at Carnegie Mellon University from 1986 to 2021, compiling a record of 234–125–2.

Playing career
A Pittsburgh native, Lackner graduated with honors from Mt. Lebanon High School, one of Pennsylvania's perennial high school football powers. As a senior, he led Mt. Lebanon to the WPIAL Class AAA title game with a 9–2 record.

Lackner had an exceptional athletic and academic career at Carnegie Mellon. A four-year starter at linebacker, he was a three-time All-Presidents' Athletic Conference pick as well as the PAC's 1976 Defensive Player-of-the-Year. In 1978, Lackner was named to the Pittsburgh Press All-District Team and received a Pittsburgh Post-Gazette Dapper Dan Award. Also a model student, he was twice named an Academic All-American.

During his playing career, Carnegie Mellon had a four-year mark of 28–7–1 and won PAC titles in 1977 and 1978. The Tartans advanced to the NCAA Division III playoffs in 1978, marking their first postseason appearance since the 1939 Sugar Bowl.

Coaching career
Following his 1979 graduation from Carnegie Mellon with a bachelor's degree in history, Lackner remained with head coach Chuck Klausing as an assistant coach. Seven years later, Lackner was named head coach when Klausing left to join Mike Gottfried's staff at the University of Pittsburgh.

Carnegie Mellon
Named head coach in 1986, Lackner has directed the Tartans to nine conference championships and two NCAA playoff berths. Lackner passed Walter Steffen, who guided Carnegie Tech to an 88–53–8 mark from 1914 to 1932, as the winningest coach in school history on September 19, 1998 when the Tartans defeated Bethany College, 38–7.

Carnegie Mellon has risen to unprecedented prominence in the University Athletic Association (UAA) under Lackner. The Tartans own eight UAA titles and have an impressive conference record of 45–16 (.738). Lackner has been named the UAA Coach of the Year five times, in 1990, 1991, 1993, 1997, and, most recently, in 2006 after leading the Tartans to an 11–1 season, the most wins in school history and their sixth appearance in the NCAA playoffs. He was also named All-South Region Coach of the Year by D3football.com in 2006. In May 2003, Lackner was inducted into the Western Pennsylvania Hall of Fame. He was also awarded the Bob Prince Award during the Catholic Youth Organization's 29th annual dinner.

Family
Lackner and his late wife, Cindy, have two children, Nick, who is a graduate of John Carroll University and holds a MSc degree from Columbia University, and Kimberly, who is a 2005 graduate of Carnegie Mellon.

Head coaching record

See also
 List of college football coaches with 200 wins

Notes

References

External links
 Carnegie Mellon profile

1956 births
Living people
American football linebackers
Carnegie Mellon Tartans football coaches
Carnegie Mellon Tartans football players
Sportspeople from Mt. Lebanon, Pennsylvania
Sportspeople from Pittsburgh
Players of American football from Pittsburgh